The city of Albany, in the U.S. state of New York is the site of 56 high-rises, 19 of which stand taller than . Completed in 1966, it is the tallest building in New York state outside New York City. The second-tallest building is the Alfred E. Smith State Office Building, which stands .

Tallest buildings

See also
List of tallest buildings in Upstate New York

References

 
 
Albany
Albany